Eamonn O'Neill (1882 – 3 November 1954) was an Irish businessman, Cumann na nGaedheal and later Fine Gael politician.

Born in Kinsale in 1882, O'Neill was the son of James O'Neill, a Kinsale merchant and member of the first Cork County Council. He was educated at the Christian Brothers School in Youghal, the Presentation Brothers School in Kinsale, Mungret College, and the Royal University of Ireland, where he was awarded a B.A. degree in 1901.

He inherited his father's business in Kinsale. He was one of the founders of the Irish Master Bakers' Association. He campaigned to have electricity brought to Kinsale, and succeeded in 1920. From 1925 to 1928 he served on Cork County Council. He and Rev. Patrick MacSwiney, curate in Kinsale from 1927 to 1940, supported each other in their endeavours to improve the economic, social and cultural situation in the depressed town.

O'Neill was an unsuccessful Cumann na nGaedheal candidate at the September 1927 general election in the 5-seat Cork West constituency. He stood again at the next opportunity, at the 1932 general election, and was elected as a Teachta Dála (TD) for Cork West. He was re-elected at the next three general elections, before losing his seat at the 1943 general election to the Clann na Talmhan candidate Patrick O'Driscoll. He served as Leas-Cheann Comhairle from May 1939 to May 1943.

He was re-elected a year later, at the 1944 general election, unseating his Fine Gael colleague Timothy O'Donovan. The Cork West constituency was reduced to a 3-seater at the 1948 general election, and O'Neill stood in the Cork South constituency but was not re-elected. He did not contest any further elections.

He was an active sportsman; he donated the O'Neill Cup for junior rugby clubs in County Cork. He was also an accomplished singer and musician and a supporter of the arts in Cork.

References

Cumann na nGaedheal TDs
Fine Gael TDs
1882 births
1954 deaths
Members of the 7th Dáil
Members of the 8th Dáil
Members of the 9th Dáil
Members of the 10th Dáil
Members of the 12th Dáil
Alumni of the Royal University of Ireland
People from Kinsale
Politicians from County Cork
Local councillors in County Cork